Sir John Henry Morris, KCSI (9 April 1828 – 14 September 1912) was an administrator in British India. He was Chief Commissioner of the Central Provinces from 1867 to 1883.

References
 https://www.ukwhoswho.com/view/10.1093/ww/9780199540891.001.0001/ww-9780199540884-e-189194

1828 births
1912 deaths
Place of birth missing
Place of death missing